Prabhunarayan Yadav is an Indian politician and a member of 17th Legislative Assembly, Uttar Pradesh of India. He represents the Sakaldiha constituency in Chandauli district of Uttar Pradesh.

Political career
Prabhunarayan Yadav contested Uttar Pradesh Assembly Election as Samajwadi Party candidate and defeated his close contestant Suryamuni Tiwari from Bhartiya Janata Party with a margin of 14,696 votes.

Posts held

See also
Uttar Pradesh Legislative Assembly

References

Year of birth missing (living people)
Living people
Bharatiya Janata Party politicians from Uttar Pradesh
Uttar Pradesh MLAs 2017–2022
Uttar Pradesh MLAs 2022–2027